Pahi is a settlement in Northland, New Zealand. It is at the end of a peninsula in the Kaipara Harbour, bounded by inlets to the Paparoa Creek to the west and the Pahi River to the east. Paparoa is 6 km to the north, and Matakohe is 4 km to the north-west.

Pahi was one of several Kaipara settlements established by a religious group known as Albertlanders. Port Albert near Wellsford was the main settlement, and Matakohe was another. After the Paparoa Block was settled in 1863, a road was constructed to the port at Pahi in 1865.

The steamer Minnie Casey ran a weekly service from Pahi to Helensville on the south side of the Kaipara from 1882, and the S.S. Ethel took over from 1891 to 1895, after which services went only to Matakohe and Pahi.

Pahi is best known for its annual regatta; the Pahi Regatta Club was established in 1887, and a regatta has been held every year except 1925. Taking place over three days, events included sailing and later motorboat races, children's sports, foot races, aquatic events,  rowing, and horse-swimming races across the  strait to Whakapirau and back. Horse-swimming races ceased after a horse and rider drowned.

Demographics
Pahi is part of the larger Otamatea statistical area.

Pahi had a population of 255 at the 2018 New Zealand census, an increase of 75 people (41.7%) since the 2013 census, and an increase of 57 people (28.8%) since the 2006 census. There were 99 households, comprising 120 males and 132 females, giving a sex ratio of 0.91 males per female. The median age was 57.5 years (compared with 37.4 years nationally), with 42 people (16.5%) aged under 15 years, 15 (5.9%) aged 15 to 29, 105 (41.2%) aged 30 to 64, and 90 (35.3%) aged 65 or older.

Ethnicities were 95.3% European/Pākehā, 21.2% Māori, and 1.2% Asian. People may identify with more than one ethnicity.

Although some people chose not to answer the census's question about religious affiliation, 48.2% had no religion, 40.0% were Christian and 4.7% had other religions.

Of those at least 15 years old, 21 (9.9%) people had a bachelor's or higher degree, and 57 (26.8%) people had no formal qualifications. The median income was $21,000, compared with $31,800 nationally. 15 people (7.0%) earned over $70,000 compared to 17.2% nationally. The employment status of those at least 15 was that 66 (31.0%) people were employed full-time, 39 (18.3%) were part-time, and 12 (5.6%) were unemployed.

Gallery

References 

Kaipara District
Populated places in the Northland Region
Populated places around the Kaipara Harbour